T. J. Marti is an American businessman, pharmacist, and politician serving as a member of the Oklahoma House of Representatives from the 75th district. He assumed office on November 21, 2018.

Early life and education 
Marti was raised in Western Oklahoma and moved to Tulsa in 2009. He earned a Doctor of Pharmacy from the University of Oklahoma Health Sciences Center.

Career 
Marti has worked for chain and independent pharmacies. He founded CareFirst Pharmacy in 2010 and also operates CareFirst Insurance. Marti was elected to the Oklahoma House of Representatives in November 2018. Marti also serves as chair of the House Alcohol, Tobacco & Controlled Substances Committee.

References 

Living people
Republican Party members of the Oklahoma House of Representatives
People from Broken Arrow, Oklahoma
People from Tulsa, Oklahoma
Pharmacists from Oklahoma
Politicians from Tulsa, Oklahoma
University of Oklahoma alumni
Year of birth missing (living people)